Ron Smerczak (3 July 1949 – 12 May 2019) was a British-born South African actor who had appeared in South African telenovelas and contributed to South African cinema.

Early life
Smerczak was born on 3 July 1949 in the UK. Smerczak attended the National Youth Theatre of Great Britain from 1965-1970 and the Royal
Academy of Dramatic Art London from 1969-1971. Thereafter, Smerczak completed his graduation from University of Cardiff.

Acting career
Smerczak appeared in numerous South African television shows. Plus worked in several films including American Ninja 4: The Annihilation, Who Am I?, Cyborg Cop and many others.

Partial filmography

 House of Whipcord (1974) - Ted
 One Away (1976) - Young Policeman at Roadblock
 Kill and Kill Again (1981) - Marduks guard (uncredited)
 Prisoners of the Lost Universe (1983) - Head Trader
 Torn Allegiance (1984) - Pte. Stan Archer
 Deadly Passion (1985) - Plainclothes Cop
 Shaka Zulu (1986, TV Mini-Series) - Ogle
 Master of Dragonard Hill (1987) - Sergeant
 Scavengers (1988) - Captain Barlow
 Return of the Family Man (1989) - The Family Man
 American Eagle (1989) - Edward Slovak
 Toxic Effect (1989) - Jonathan Forbes
 Burndown (1990) - Mason
 The Fourth Reich (1990) - General Karlowa
 American Ninja 4: The Annihilation (1990) - Maksood
 Oh Shucks! Here Comes UNTAG (1990) - Nigel Shady
 Incident at Victoria Falls (1992, TV Movie) - Lt. Grisholm 
 Cyborg Cop (1993) - Callan
 Jock of the Bushveld (1994) - Seedling
 Freefall (1994) - John Horner
 Trigger Fast (1994) - Sgt. Tring
 The Mangler (1995) - Officer Steele
 Lunarcop (1995) - Aragon
 Cry, the Beloved Country (1995) - Captain van Jaarsveld
 Dangerous Ground (1997) - Interrogation Policeman
 Who Am I? (1998) - Morgan
 Beings (1998) - PC Jim Blythe
 Operation Delta Force 3: Clear Target (1998) - Professor Johnson
 Traitor's Heart (1999) - Senator John Mahoney
 Kin (2000) - Hans
 Operation Delta Force 5: Random Fire (2000) - General Thompson
 The Little Unicorn (2001) - Sam the Vet
 Witness to a Kill (2001) - Gunther
 Glory Glory (2002) - Packer
 Pets (2002) - Sonny
 Stander (2003) - Wild Coast Cop
 Dead Easy (2004) - Bud Klein
 Beauty and the Beast (2005) - Ragnar
 Straight Outta Benoni (2005) - Priest
 The Secret of Terror Castle (2009) - Worthington
 Finding Lenny (2009) - Arthur Jackson
 Amelia (2009) - Reporter #3
 The Algiers Murders (2013) - Detective Don Bastick
 Cry of Love (2016) - Ben
 Harry's Game (2017) - Detective Don

References

External links
 
 Ron Smerczak at Rotten Tomatoes
 Ron Smerczak online
 Ron Smerczak at ESAT

1949 births
2019 deaths
South African male stage actors
South African male film actors
South African male television actors
British male film actors
British male radio actors
British male stage actors
British male television actors
British male voice actors
Alumni of Cardiff University
National Youth Theatre members
British emigrants to South Africa
South African expatriates in the United States